Angela O'Leary (1879–1921) was a Rhode Island artist and model. O'Leary studied at the Rhode Island School of Design; she took classes with Sydney Richmond Burleigh and became a member of the Providence Art Club and the Providence Watercolor Club. O'Leary often painted landscapes and genre scenes. She died after attempting to commit suicide in the Fleur-de-lys Studios. The Providence Art Club held a memorial exhibition in her honor after her death.

External links
 Two Women at the Shore painting

References

1879 births
1921 deaths
American women artists
Artists from Providence, Rhode Island